WRVU-LP (92.3 FM, "Radio Vision") is a radio station licensed to serve the community of Grand Rapids, Michigan. The station is owned by Iglesia Del Rey and airs a Spanish religious format.

The station was assigned the WRVU-LP call letters by the Federal Communications Commission on December 6, 2014.

References

External links
 Official Website
 FCC Public Inspection File for WRVU-LP
 

RVU-LP
Radio stations established in 2016
2016 establishments in Michigan
Spanish-language radio stations in the United States
RVU-LP
Kent County, Michigan